Bromelia serra is a species of plant in the family Bromeliaceae native to South America (Brazil, French Guiana, Bolivia, Paraguay, Argentina). It is one of  several plants used by the Wichí people as a fiber for weaving called chaguar.

References

serra
Flora of South America
Plants described in 1879